The Sunday Times Rich List 2012 is the 24th annual survey of the wealthiest people in the United Kingdom, published by The Sunday Times on 29 April 2012.

Top 17 fortunes

See also 
 Forbes list of billionaires

References

External links 
 Sunday Times Rich List

Sunday Times Rich List
2012 in the United Kingdom